Kirkcudbright railway station served the town of Kirkcudbright, Dumfries and Galloway, Scotland from 1864 to 1965 on the Kirkcudbright Railway.

History 
The station opened on 7 March 1864 by the Glasgow and South Western Railway. To the west was the goods shed as well as its respective sidings and a cattle dock which was built in 1894. To the north was the signal box, which opened in 1889, and a siding for the engine shed which was situated at the north end of the platform. In 1955 the engine shed closed and the signal box was replaced with a ground frame. The station closed to both passengers and goods traffic on 3 May 1965.

References

External links 

Disused railway stations in Dumfries and Galloway
Railway stations in Great Britain opened in 1864
Railway stations in Great Britain closed in 1965
1864 establishments in Scotland
1965 disestablishments in Scotland
Beeching closures in Scotland
Former Glasgow and South Western Railway stations
Kirkcudbright